Guglielmo Plüschow (born Wilhelm Plüschow; August 18, 1852 – January 3, 1930) was a German photographer who moved to Italy and became known for his nude photos of local youths, predominantly males. Plüschow was a cousin of Wilhelm von Gloeden, who, despite taking up nude photography later than Plüschow, soon overshadowed him. Plüschow was several times at odds with the law and charged with corruption of minors. Today, his photography is recognized for its artistic merits, but it generally is considered somewhat inferior to Gloeden's because of his less graceful handling of lighting and the sometimes strangely stilted poses of his models.

Biography

Not much is known about Plüschow's early life, except that he was born in Wismar as the eldest of seven brothers and sisters. His father Friedrich Carl Eduard Plüschow was an illegitimate child of Frederick Louis, Hereditary Grand Duke of Mecklenburg-Schwerin and the family home was Schloss Plüschow.

In the early 1870s, he moved to Rome and changed his first name from Wilhelm to its Italian equivalent Guglielmo. Initially making a living as a wine merchant, he soon turned to male and female nude photography. Later he also worked in Naples.

One of Plüschow's more famous models was Vincenzo Galdi (pictured left), who was probably one of Plüschow's lovers. Galdi later became a photographer in his own right, as well as an art gallery owner.

In 1902, Plüschow, who was gay like Gloeden, was charged with "common procuration" and "seduction of minors" and had to spend eight months in jail. Another scandal followed in 1907, and in 1910, Plüschow left Italy for good and returned to Berlin. The accusations caused the police to seize a lot of his photographs, while Vincenzo Galdi was considered his accomplice.

In popular culture
In Steve Berman's short story "The Haferbräutigam" Plüschow has an encounter with a mischievous spirit while travelling back to Wismar in 1907.

Gallery

See also

References

Literature

 Bernhard Albers (ed.), Galdi / Gloeden /  Plüschow. Aktaufnahmen aus der Sammlung Uwe Scheid, Rimbaud Presse, Aachen 1993
 Et in Arcadia ego. Fotografien von Wilhelm von Gloeden, Guglielmo Plüschow und Vincenzo Galdi, Edition Oehrli, Zurich 2000
 Volker Janssen (ed.), Wilhelm von Gloeden, Wilhelm von Plüschow, Vincenzo Galdi: Italienische Jünglings-Photographien um 1900, Janssen Verlag, Berlin 1991
 Marina Miraglia, Guglielmo Plüschow alla ricerca del bello ideale, in: "AFT (Archivio Fotografico Toscano)", IV 7, luglio 1988, pp. 62–67
 Ulrich Pohlmann, Wer war Guglielmo Plüschow?, "Fotogeschichte", n. 29, VIII 1988, pp. 33–38.
 Uwe Scheid, Il vero nudo: Aktstudien von Guglielmo Plüschow, "Fotogeschichte" n. 29, VIII 1988, pp. 9–21.
 Peter Weiermair, Guglielmo Plüschow, Taschen verlag, Köln 1994 
 Winckelmann (pseud.), A rediscovered boy-photographer. Guglielmo Plüschow (1852-1930), "Gayme" n. III 1, 1996, pp. 22–30.

External links

 Catalogue of Wilhelm von Plüschow's pictures. 
 Biography and gallery of his works
Gallery on the official website of Schloss Plüschow
Biography with citations (in Italian) and gallery

Bibliography
 Canet, Nicole (editor), von Plüschow, Galdi, von Gloeden - Beautés Siciliennes - Nicole Canet, Paris, 2014.

1852 births
1930 deaths
People from Wismar
People from the Grand Duchy of Mecklenburg-Schwerin
Photographers from Mecklenburg-Western Pomerania
Gay photographers
German gay artists
German LGBT photographers
Photography in Italy
German erotic photographers
Nude photography
German expatriates in Italy